Enco may refer to: 

Enco River in Chile
Enco (brand), a secondary brand used by Humble Oil (now part of ExxonMobil) in certain parts of the United States from 1960 to 1973.